"Won't Forget You" is a 2022 song by Shouse.

Won't Forget You may also refer to:

 "Won't Forget You", a 2017 song by Pixie Lott featuring Stylo G
 Won't Forget You (single album), by Kim Sung-kyu, 2021

See also
 Never Forget You (disambiguation)